Alberic "Briek" Schotte (born Kanegem, West Flanders, 7 September 1919 – died Kortrijk, 4 April 2004) was a Belgian professional road racing cyclist, one of the champions of the 1940s and 1950s. His stamina earned him the nickname "Iron Briek" (IJzeren Briek).

He was world champion in 1948 and 1950, won the last stage of the 1947 Tour de France and finished second in the 1948 Tour, behind Gino Bartali. He twice won the Tour of Flanders (1942, 1948), Paris–Tours (1946, 1947) and Paris–Brussels (1946, 1952). He also won the inaugural Challenge Desgrange-Colombo, a season-long competition to identify the world's best road rider, in 1948. He holds the record with twenty consecutive participations in the Tour of Flanders and in addition to his two victories made the podium on six other occasions. Schotte corresponded to the archetype of the Flandrien, the diligent farm boy who competes against better equipped and guided riders from France and Italy. Although he himself put that into perspective: "Because of my position on the bike, I gave the impression that I was suffering more than was actually the case".

After retirement in 1959, he was a team coach for 30 years, mostly for Flandria where he also served as Directeur Sportif for many years. Riders such as Rik Van Looy, Herman Van Springel, Freddy Maertens, Eddy Merckx, Sean Kelly, Joop Zoetemelk, Michel Pollentier, Walter Godefroot and Roger De Vlaeminck rode for Schotte at various points during their respective careers. None of these riders would win the Tour de France while riding for Flandria, however Zoetemelk would finish 2nd in 1970 and 1971 while riding under Schotte's direction.

He died on the day of the 2004 Tour of Flanders. The commentators during the race said "God must have been one of Briek's greatest fans".

Major results

1939
 1st Overall Tour de l'Ouest
 1st GP de Bruxelles
1940
 1st Ransart–Beaumont–Ransart
 3rd Tour of Flanders
1941
 1st  Kampioenschap van Vlaanderen
 1st Desselgem Koerse
 1st Merelbeke
 2nd Grote 1-MeiPrijs
 3rd GP Stad Zottegem
1942
 1st Tour of Flanders
 1st Desselgem Koerse
 1st Oostkamp
 3rd Omloop der Vlaamse Gewesten
1943
 1st Desselgem Koerse
 3rd La Flèche Française (TTT)
 3rd Liège–Bastogne–Liège
1944
 1st Wetteren
 2nd Tour of Flanders
 2nd La Flèche Wallonne
1945
 1st Nokere Koerse
 1st Tielt–Antwerpen–Tielt
 1st Olsene
 1st Waregem
 2nd Dwars door België
 2nd Halle–Ingooigem
 2nd Gullegem Koerse
 2nd Brussels–Everbeek
 2nd Circuit de Paris
 3rd Across Paris
 3rd Circuit de la Capitale
 3rd Brussels–Sint-Truiden
1946
 1st  Interclubs road race, National Road Championships
 1st Omloop Mandel-Leie-Schelde
 1st Paris–Tours
 1st  Overall Tour de Luxembourg
1st Stages 1 & 2
 1st Omloop der Vlaamse Gewesten
 1st Paris–Brussels
 2nd Gullegem Koerse
 2nd Halle–Ingooigem
 2nd Road race, National Road Championships
 3rd Tour of Flanders
 3rd Overall Dwars door België
1st Stage 1
 3rd Nokere Koerse
1947
 1st  Interclubs road race, National Road Championships
 1st Paris–Tours
 1st Stage 21 Tour de France
 1st Circuit de la Region Liniere
 1st Heule
 2nd GP Tielt
 3rd GP Stad Vilvoorde
1948
 1st  Road race, UCI Road World Championships
 1st Challenge Desgrange-Colombo
 1st Tour of Flanders
 2nd Road race, National Road Championships
 2nd La Flèche Wallonne
 2nd Road race, National Road Championships
 2nd Overall Tour de France
1949
 1st GP Stad Vilvoorde
 3rd Tour of Flanders
1950
 1st  Road race, UCI Road World Championships
 1st Gent–Wevelgem
 1st Stage 5 Tour of the Netherlands
 1st Critérium Aalst
 1st Montenaken
 2nd Road race, National Road Championships
 2nd Tour of Flanders
 2nd Gullegem Koerse
 3rd Omloop Het Volk
1951
 1st Vijfbergenomloop
 3rd Brussels–Izegem
1952
 1st Omloop der Zuid-West-Vlaamse Bergen
 1st Paris–Brussels
 2nd Paris–Tours
 3rd Tour of Flanders
1953
 1st Overall Dwars door België
1st Stage 2b
 1st Grote Bevrijdingsprijs
 1st Antwerpen–Luik–Antwerpen
 1st Antwerpse Havenpijl
 1st Waregem
 2nd Paris–Brussels
 2nd Overall Tour of Belgium
1954
 1st  Kampioenschap van Vlaanderen
 1st Omloop der drie Provinciën
 1st Prix de Soignies
 1st Oedelem
 2nd Overall Dwars door België
 2nd Overall Omloop Mandel-Leie-Schelde
 3rd GP Mesen
1955
 1st Gent–Wevelgem
 1st Overall Dwars door België
1st Stage 2b
 1st Scheldeprijs Vlaanderen
 2nd Nokere Koerse
 2nd Paris–Limoges
1956
 1st Overall GP Bali
1st Stage 1
 1st Lauwe
 1st Boulogne-sur-Mer
 1st Stage 1 (TTT) Driedaagse van Antwerpen
 2nd Omloop Het Volk
 3rd Kuurne–Brussels–Kuurne
1957
 1st  Interclubs road race, National Road Championships
 1st Wervik
 1st Langemark
 3rd Circuit des Régions Frontalières
1958
 1st  Interclubs road race, National Road Championships
 1st Wervik
 1st De Panne
 1st Stage 1 (TTT) Driedaagse van Antwerpen
 2nd GP Roeselare
 3rd Harelbeke–Antwerp–Harelbeke
1959
 3rd Dwars door België

Awards and honours 

 Challenge Desgrange-Colombo: 1948
 Trophée Edmond Gentil: 1948
 Belgian National Sports Merit Award: 1950
 Swiss AIOCC Trophy: 1972
 Honorary Citizen of Waregem: 1987
 Statue in Kanegem: 1996
 UCI Hall of Fame: 2002
 GP Briek Schotte: since 2004
 Monument and square in Desselgem: 2005
 Bust in Waregem: 2007
 Monument in Moorslede: 2010
 10 Euro Silver commemorative coin: 2019

Books 
 20 jaren rennersloopbaan van Briek Schotte by Berten Lafosse in 1955, Atlas Kortrijk, 79 p. (Dutch)
 IJzeren Briek: de wielersport zal niet sterven: het levensverhaal van Briek Schotte by André Blancke in 1987, Het Volk, 192 p. (Dutch) 
 Briek Schotte by Noël Truyers in 1998, De Eecloonaar, 48 p. (Dutch) 
 Briek Schotte: de laatste der Flandriens by Rik Vanwalleghem and Bo Decramer in 1999, Lannoo, 176 p. (Dutch) 
 Briek Schotte: De erfenis van Briek by Rik Vanwalleghem and Anna Luyten in 2011, Kannibaal, 187 p. (Dutch) 
 Briek! De laatste Flandrien by Herman Chevrolet in 2019, De Arbeiderspers, 248 p. (Dutch) 
 Flandrien by Stephan Vanfleteren in 2021, Kannibaal, 132 p. (Dutch)

References

External links 

Official Tour de France results for Alberic Schotte

1919 births
2004 deaths
Belgian Tour de France stage winners
Belgian male cyclists
UCI Road World Champions (elite men)
People from Tielt
Sportspeople from West Flanders
Challenge Desgrange-Colombo winners